Virginia Hollinger (February 4, 1917 – March 17, 1946) of Dayton, Ohio, was an amateur tennis player in the 1930s and 1940s.

At the tournament in Cincinnati, she won singles titles in 1937 & 1938, and was a singles finalist in 1936 and 1939.

She won numerous junior titles, including the National Girls Indoor Championship in 1934, 1935 and 1936. She also won the singles and doubles titles at the 1934 Western Girls Championships, and was a quarterfinalist in the 1934 National Girls' Championship.

In 1938 she won the U.S. Indoor Championships singles title after defeating Katherine Winthrop in the final.

A tennis club in her hometown of Dayton bears her name: The Virginia Hollinger Memorial Tennis Club.

References

 Obituary for Virginia Hollinger McCloud, Dayton Herald, 18 Mar 1946, page 1
From Club Court to Center Court by Phillip S. Smith (2008 Edition)

External links
 Hollinger Memorial Tennis Club

American female tennis players
Tennis people from Ohio
Sportspeople from Dayton, Ohio
1917 births
1946 deaths
20th-century American women